Family Affair is an album by the American musician Philip Bailey, released through Word Records in 1989.

Critical reception

The Calgary Herald noted that "most of the music here would not be out of place on the pop charts."

Track listing

Personnel

Musicians 
 Philip Bailey – lead vocals, backing vocals (3, 4, 6, 10), drum programming (7, 9) 
 Oliver Wells – keyboards, synthesizer programming, backing vocals (9), orchestra arrangements and conductor (10)
 Morgan Winters – Synclavier programming, additional synthesizer programming (5)
 Monty Seward – keyboards (2), synthesizer programming (2), additional rhythm track arrangements (2)
 Billy Savage – synthesizer programming (4, 9)
 Bruce Allen – Hammond B3 organ (7)
 Richard Smallwood – acoustic piano (7, 10), additional rhythm track arrangements (7)
 Steve Deutsch – additional synthesizer programming (8)
 Ricky Keller – additional synthesizer programming (8)
 Pat Buchanan – guitars (1)
 Sheldon Reynolds – guitars (2, 7)
 A. Ray Fuller – guitars (3, 4, 6, 8, 9)
 Andrew Gouche – bass (7)
 Scott Meeder – drums (1), drum programming (1)
 David Huff – drum programming (3, 4, 6-9)
 Jack Bell – percussion (10), timpani (10)
 Kirk Whalum – tenor sax solo (5), soprano sax solo (9)
 Sandy Arenz – oboe (10)
 Brice Andrus – French horn (10)
 Thomas Witte – French horn (10)
 Jere Flint – cello (10)
 Nancy Maddox – cello (10)
 Ruth Ann Little – violin (10)
 Oscar Pereira – violin (10)
 Willard Shull – violin (10)
 Marie Yadzinski – violin (10)
 John Askew – backing vocals (1)
 Robin Brown – backing vocals (1)
 William Croom – backing vocals (1)
 Taj Harmon – backing vocals (1)
 Joseph N. Johnson – backing vocals (1)
 Carl Caldwell – backing vocals (2, 3, 4, 6, 8, 9)
 Renée Crutcher – backing vocals (2, 3, 4, 6)
 Jean Johnson – backing vocals (2, 3, 4, 6)
 Rick Nelson – backing vocals (2, 3, 4, 6)
 Alfie Silas – backing vocals (2, 3, 4, 6)
 The Williams Brothers – backing vocals (7)
 Melvin Williams – additional BGV arrangements (7)
 Daryl Coley – vocal conductor (8, 9), address BGV arrangements (8), choir conductor (10), backing vocals (10)
 Lucretia Berkins – backing vocals (8, 9, 10)
 Robert Craig – backing vocals (8, 9, 10)
 Mittie Dawson-Allen – backing vocals (8, 9, 10)
 Gina Dowell – backing vocals (8, 9, 10)
 Andrea Hurst – backing vocals (8, 9)
 Ed Marshall – backing vocals (8, 9)
 Beverly Nelson-Brown – backing vocals (8, 9, 10)
 Shannon Sterling – backing vocals (8, 9, 10)
 Tina Sterling – backing vocals (8, 9, 10)
 Keila Stewart – backing vocals (8, 9, 10)
 Eddie Williams – backing vocals (8, 9)
 Leon Patillo – backing vocals (9)
 Gwendolyn Culp – backing vocals (10)

Production 
 Producers and Arrangements – Philip Bailey and Oliver Wells
 Executive Producer – Dan Posthuma 
 Engineers – Jeff Balding, Dean Burt, Ron Christopher, Tony D'Amico, Maureen Droney, David Huff, Ricky Keller, Paul Klingberg, Al Phillips, Chris Rich, Martin Schmelzle, Josh Schneider and Jim Zumpano.
 Second Engineers – David Bates, Scott Carter and Reid Hall.
 Recorded at Hollywood Sound Recorders, Ignited Studio,  (Hollywood, CA); Le Gonks West (West Hollywood, CA); Wildcat Studios, Studio 55 and Valley Center Studios (Los Angeles, CA); Mastersound Studios, Soundscape Studios and Southern Living Studios (Atlanta, GA); Huff Recording Studios (Forrest, MS).
 Mixing – Dan Garcia (Tracks 1, 5, 7 & 10); Dean Burt (Tracks 2, 3, 4, 6, 8 & 9).
 Mixed at Hollywood Sound Recorders.
 Mastered by Doug Sax at The Mastering Lab (Hollywood, CA).
 Art Direction – Laurie Fink
 Design – Nellie Prestwood
 Photography – Randee St. Nicholas

Charts

References

Philip Bailey albums
1989 albums
Word Records albums
Albums produced by Philip Bailey